Tentacles is the debut album by the band Crystal Antlers. It was released via Touch and Go Records on April 7, 2009 in the USA and a day earlier in the UK. Tentacles marked the final new release on Touch and Go for the foreseeable future after the label decided to downsize its operations significantly.

The album was met with a generally positive reception by critics, attaining a score of 71% from the reviews collated by Metacritic.

Track listing

 "Painless Sleep" - 2:16
 "Dust" - 2:27
 "Time Erased" - 3:37
 "Andrew" - 3:34
 "Vapour Trail" - 2:18
 "Tentacles" - 1:54
 "Until the Sun Dies (Part 1)" - 2:50
 "Memorized" - 3:53
 "Glacier" - 3:01
 "Foot of the Mountain" - 0:25
 "Your Spears" - 2:24
 "Swollen Sky" - 4:12
 "Several Tongues" - 7:11

Personnel

Jonny Bell: vocals, bass, woodwind
Errol Davis: guitar, organ
Andrew King: guitar
Victor Rodriguez-Guerrero: organ, piano
Damian Edwards: percussion, woodwind
Kevin Stuart: drums
Daniel Hawk: brass on tracks 8 and 9

References

2009 debut albums
Touch and Go Records albums